Monte Spinarda is a  mountain of the Ligurian Prealps in Italy.

Geography 
The mountain belongs to the Ligurian Alps and is located between the province of Savona (Liguria, south) and the province of Cuneo (Piedmont, north). Monte Spinarda is the tripoint where the Ligurian comune of Calizzano and the Piedmontese ones of Garessio and Priola meet. Is located very close to the drainage divide between Tanaro and Bormida valleys, on the Bormida valley side, a very long ridge which branches from the Main chain of the Alps at Monte Cianea. In the SOIUSA (International Standardized Mountain Subdivision of the Alps) Monte Spinarda belongs to the Ligurian Prealps and, within them, to Monte Carmo group and Dorsale Spinarda-Sotta subgroup (SOIUSA code:I/A-1.I-A.2.b).

Geology 
The Anfiboliti di monte Spinarda, an outcrop of amphibolites recordered in the Italian official geologic map, was named after the mountain.

History 

The area surrounding Monte Spinarda was involved by wartime operations linked to the Italian campaigns of  Napoleone Bonaparte and in 1799 the Frenche Army occupied its summit. Nearby, in a place called Vignale, during the 19th century mineralogists found some gold in the form of sulphate.

Access to the summit 
The summit of Monte Spinarda can be easily reached on foot by Colle del Quazzo or, with a longer walk, from  Calizzano. During snowy winters the summit can also be accessed with snowshoes. The hike is appreciated not only for the good views on the surrounding mountains, but also for its low risk of avalanches.

Conservation 
Monte Spinarda slopes are mainly covered with beech woods and shrubs. Its Ligurian side belongs to the SIC (Site of Community Importance) called Monte Spinarda - Rio Nero - code IT1323014.

Maps

References

One-thousanders of Italy
Mountains of Liguria
Mountains of Piedmont
Mountains of the Ligurian Alps
Province of Savona
Province of Cuneo